Xpedition may refer to:

 Xpedition (ship), a cruise ship for celebrity cruises and one of three vessels making up the Xpedition class
 Xpedition class
 Xpedition (CAD software), an EDA tool by Mentor Graphics

See also
+ Expedition (disambiguation)